Hurst Green may refer to the following places in England:

Hurst Green, East Sussex
Hurst Green, Essex, a location
Hurst Green, Lancashire
Hurst Green, Surrey
Hurst Green, West Midlands